In general topology, a subset  of a topological space is said to be dense-in-itself or crowded
if  has no isolated point.

A dense-in-itself closed set is called a perfect set.  (In other words, a perfect set is a closed set without isolated point.)

The notion of dense set is unrelated to dense-in-itself.  This can sometimes be confusing, as "X is dense in X" (always true) is not the same as "X is dense-in-itself" (no isolated point).

Examples
A simple example of a set that is dense-in-itself but not closed (and hence not a perfect set) is the set of irrational numbers (considered as a subset of the real numbers). This set is dense-in-itself because every neighborhood of an irrational number  contains at least one other irrational number . On the other hand, the set of irrationals is not closed because every rational number lies in its closure. Similarly, the set of rational numbers is also dense-in-itself but not closed in the space of real numbers.

The above examples, the irrationals and the rationals, are also dense sets in their topological space, namely . As an example that is dense-in-itself but not dense in its topological space, consider . This set is not dense in  but is dense-in-itself.

Properties
A singleton subset of a space  can never be dense-in-itself, because its unique point is isolated in it.

The dense-in-itself subsets of any space are closed under unions. In a dense-in-itself space, they include all open sets. In a dense-in-itself T1 space they include all dense sets. However, spaces that are not T1 may have dense subsets that are not dense-in-itself: for example in the space  with the indiscrete topology, the set  is dense, but is not dense-in-itself.

The closure of any dense-in-itself set is a perfect set.

In general, the intersection of two dense-in-itself sets is not dense-in-itself.  But the intersection of a dense-in-itself set and an open set is dense-in-itself.

See also
 Nowhere dense set
 Glossary of topology
 Dense order

Notes

References
 
 
 

Topology